Dorjzovdyn Ganbat (born 15 August 1950) is a Mongolian former wrestler who competed in the 1972 Summer Olympics.

References

External links 
 

1950 births
Living people
Mongolian male sport wrestlers
Olympic wrestlers of Mongolia
Wrestlers at the 1972 Summer Olympics
Asian Games medalists in wrestling
Asian Games bronze medalists for Mongolia
Wrestlers at the 1974 Asian Games
Wrestlers at the 1978 Asian Games
Medalists at the 1978 Asian Games
21st-century Mongolian people
20th-century Mongolian people